Knežja Vas is a village in the Municipality of Trebnje in eastern Slovenia. The area is part of the historical region of Lower Carniola. The municipality is now included in the Southeast Slovenia Statistical Region.

Name
The name Knežja vas literally means 'duke's village' and refers to feudal ownership of the settlement. Similar names in Slovenia with the same origin include Kneža, Knežak, and Knežina. The former German name of the village, Grafendorf (literally, 'count's village'), semantically corresponds to the Slovene name.

Church
The local church is dedicated to Saint Agnes and belongs to the Parish of Dobrnič. It was first mentioned in written documents dating to 1526.

Notable people
In 1797 the Roman Catholic missionary, bishop, and grammarian Frederic Baraga was born in Mala Vas Castle in Mala Vas, which is now a hamlet in the northern part of Knežja Vas but was a separate settlement in the past. The 17th-century manor in which he was born houses a small museum dedicated to him. On 10 or 11 April 1721 Maximillian Morautscher, a professor of physics in Laibach (now Ljubljana) and one of the founders of the Slovene Philharmonic Orchestra, was born in the same house. The building has been converted into a museum.

References

External links
Knežja Vas at Geopedia

Populated places in the Municipality of Trebnje